"Mr. Plow" is the ninth episode of the fourth season of the American animated television series The Simpsons. It originally aired on the Fox Network in the United States on November 19, 1992. In the episode, Homer buys a snowplow and starts a business plowing driveways. It is a huge success, and inspired by this, Barney Gumble starts a rival company and quickly puts Homer out of business.

The episode was written by Jon Vitti and directed by Jim Reardon. The episode was well received, with some critics calling it one of the best in the show's history.

Dan Castellaneta won his second consecutive Emmy Award for "Outstanding Voice-Over Performance" for this episode (Castellaneta performs the voice of both Homer and Barney in the series). The episode was also submitted in the "Outstanding Comedy Series" category although ultimately it was not nominated.

Plot
Springfield is hit by a blizzard, so Marge calls Homer at Moe's Tavern and tells him to come home. On the way home, Homer's view is obscured by the snow, and he crashes into the family's station wagon. As both cars are completely totaled, Homer begins searching for a new car, and after several unsuccessful attempts, the family go to a car show.

After an unsettling encounter with Adam West, a salesman talks Homer into getting a snowplow. Homer agrees on the basis that he can make the payments by plowing people's driveways. Homer starts his snowplowing business, titled "Mr. Plow", but he has trouble finding any customers. His advertising campaigns are unsuccessful until Lisa suggests an advertisement on late night local television. The resulting commercial and jingle attracts many customers and the business is a booming success. Homer is given the key to the city in recognition of his service to the community.

Barney, after being humiliated while working as a mascot for a baby supply store, asks how he can be a success as well. Homer advises him to go out and be the best Barney he can be. The next day, it is revealed that Barney has purchased an even bigger plow and has started a rival company under the title of "Plow King". Barney creates his own commercial, with Linda Ronstadt singing the jingle, which badmouths Homer. Homer pays an agency to make him a new commercial, but it turns out to be completely baffling. As a result, Homer loses his success to Barney, and Mayor Quimby revokes his key to the city and hands it over to Barney.

To get revenge and regain his customers, Homer tricks Barney into plowing a non-existent driveway on Widow's Peak, a large, treacherous mountain outside of town. Homer begins to plow driveways again, but sees a news report showing that Barney has been trapped in an avalanche. Homer immediately drives to the mountain and rescues him. The friends resolve their differences and agree to work together in the plow business, claiming that not even God Himself can stop them. Angered, God promptly retaliates by causing a heatwave, melting all the snow and effectively putting them both out of business. As Homer can no longer make the snowplow payments, his plow is repossessed. But Marge is turned on when he wears the Mr. Plow jacket and asks him to put it on before joining her in bed.

Production

When the episode was being written, many writers' contracts had expired, so there were some writers at the annual story retreat. Al Jean was very nervous about how they could write a whole new season with such a small crew. In addition, there were several scenes added after the animatic, making the schedule even tighter. However, Jon Vitti was very committed to this episode and pitched almost the entire plot by himself.

Vitti's idea was to have Adam West be at the car show, so then they could hire him for the voice acting and Vitti could finally meet him. The other writers agreed because they were all big fans of Batman when they were children and also wanted to meet Adam West. Matt Groening said that West was one of the most popular people to ever come to the studio. Linda Ronstadt was recorded in San Francisco. Jon Vitti was tasked with recording Ronstadt, and he enjoyed it immensely. He remarked the most beautiful thing he has ever heard is Ronstadt singing the Spanish Plow King jingle.

Two more script changes that put extra pressure on the episode were a post-animatic rewrite and a complete character change. In the original script for the episode, Lenny was going to be Homer's rival as the Plow King. The idea was quickly dropped because it did not seem to fit in. The post-animatic rewrite was to include the joke in which Homer uses the radio dial to tip the precariously balanced plow back onto the road. This joke was created by Conan O'Brien, and the writers liked it so much that they included it in the episode.

The Simpsons team encountered trouble with the network censors in the scene where Homer answers the phone and pretends to be Tony Dow from Leave it to Beaver. After a brief pause, Homer replies to an inquiry by the person on the phone with "Yeah, they were gay." The censors refused to allow the line to be aired, fearing legal recourse for libel. The Simpsons crew protested, arguing that no one in particular was being implied, and that the "they" could be anybody. After numerous phone calls and arguments, the censors allowed the joke to air.

Cultural references

This episode contains several references that Al Jean referred to as "very obscure". Examples include the scene where Homer drives over a rickety bridge in the mountains, parodies a climactic action scene from William Friedkin's 1977 film Sorcerer, including a soundtrack similar to Tangerine Dream's work from the film. The scene in which Kent Brockman reports Barney's accident, in which his attire (including glasses), camera angles and facial expressions are in reference to the manner of Walter Cronkite's reporting of the Kennedy shooting.

The revamped "Mr. Plow commercial" is a parody of a similar perfume commercial that aired at the time of the episode's production. The fast-moving clouds were taken from Koyaanisqatsi, a documentary film. The music that was used in the commercial was from "Casta Diva" from Vincenzo Bellini's Norma because the Simpsons crew would not have to pay for it. At the time the episode was made, Russia did not abide by American copyright laws. In return, America did not respect Russia's copyright laws. Homer's original jingle, "Call Mr. Plow, that's my name, that name again is Mr. Plow!", is based on a radio jingle for the Roto-Rooter, which had a similar tune, "Call Roto-Rooter, that's the name, and away go troubles down the drain."

Adam West reprises as himself and is first seen signing autographs at a car show. When Adam West says he is Batman and worked with Robin, Bart does not know who Robin is, causing West to go into a tangent about how the 1990s Batman movies ruined it for the character.

Other references to include the Carnival of the Stars television show seen at the start of the episode. This is a parody of Circus of the Stars, an annual special that aired on CBS from 1976 to 1994, featuring celebrities performing circus acts. The scene where Barney gradually degrades into a drunk is a parody of the transformation sequence in the 1941 film Dr. Jekyll and Mr. Hyde. The scene where Bart is pelted with snowballs is a reference to the Sonny Corleone tollbooth shooting scene in the film The Godfather. When Moe offers free beer to Homer, Barney mentions that he hadn't done that before even for the Iranian hostages. The snowmen melting during the heatwave is a reference to the melting Nazi soldiers in the film Raiders of the Lost Ark.

Linda Ronstadt's desire to record a Spanish version of the Plow King jingle, along with her mariachi costume in Barney's commercial, both refer to her notoriety at the time for recording several popular Spanish-language albums celebrating the music of Mexico, beginning with Canciones de Mi Padre.

Reception

Critical reception
In 2003, the episode was placed sixth on Entertainment Weekly'''s top 25 The Simpsons episode list. In June 2009, Robert Canning of IGN gave the episode a score of 9.8 out of 10 and said it was "a fantastic episode that told an engaging story and was laugh-out-loud funny from start to finish. [...] There was a fun, engaging story, great guest stars poking fun at themselves, flashbacks, songs, cutaways and opportunities to highlight characters outside the series' namesake family."

In January 2010, Michael Moran of The Times ranked the episode as the second best in the show's history. Warren Martyn and Adrian Wood, the authors of the book I Can't Believe It's a Bigger and Better Updated Unofficial Simpsons Guide, enjoyed the episode. They said that it is: "A good one. The highlights; the TV show Carnival of Stars, featuring Angela Lansbury walking on hot coals ('Excitement, she wrote!'), Homer's flashback to all he's done for Barney, and best of all, the McMahon & Tate ad agency's arty commercial for Mr. Plow." In June 2012, Nathan Rabin of The A.V. Club stated that the episode "isn't just spectacularly funny and filled with classic bits: it also foretells the future. Not bad for an animated cartoon from the 1990s."

When asked to pick his favourite season out of The Simpsons seasons one through twenty, Paul Lane of the Niagara Gazette picked season four and highlighted "Brother from the Same Planet" and "Mr. Plow" which he called "excellent", along with "the sweetly funny" "Lisa's First Word", and "Homer the Heretic". The episode's reference to The Godfather was named the 37th greatest film reference in the history of the show by Total Film's Nathan Ditum. Ditum also ranked West's performance as the seventh-best guest appearance in the show's history.

When The Simpsons began streaming on Disney+ in 2019, former Simpsons writer and executive producer Bill Oakley named this one of the best classic Simpsons episodes to watch on the service.

Awards
In 1993, Dan Castellaneta won an Emmy Award for "Outstanding Voice-Over Performance" for his performance as Homer in this episode. It was his second consecutive Emmy, as he had also won in the same category the previous year. In 1993, "Mr. Plow" and "A Streetcar Named Marge" were submitted for the Primetime Emmy Award for "Outstanding Comedy Series". The Simpsons' staff had previously submitted episodes for "Outstanding Animated Program", winning twice, but that season they took a chance with the main comedy category. However, the Emmy voters were hesitant to pit cartoons against live action programs, and The Simpsons did not receive a nomination. The Simpsons' crew submitted episodes for Outstanding Comedy Series the next season, but again these were not nominated. Since then, the show has submitted episodes in the animation category and has won eight times.

Ratings
In its original broadcast, "Mr. Plow" finished 23rd in ratings for the week of November 16–22, 1992, with a Nielsen rating of 14.6, equivalent to approximately 13.6 million viewing households. It was the highest-rated show on the Fox network that week, berating Married... with Children''.

Legacy
On December 17, 2015, Google and YouTube modernized the episode and its "Mr. Plow" jingle for use in a commercial in which Lisa uses the website on her computer to place Homer's advertisement onto its YouTube campaign.

References

External links

 
 

The Simpsons (season 4) episodes
1992 American television episodes
Cultural depictions of Adam West
Snowplows